MV Ascension is an American-flagged general cargo and container ship with a capacity of .  Built in 1993, the ship was originally a Russian timber carrier.  She was bought by Sealift Incorporated in 1998 and was providing a cargo liner service between Cape Canaveral, Florida and Ascension Island until 2012.

History
The ship was built in Turkey as the MV Chekov and originally used by Russian operators to carry timber.

Sealift Incorporated bought the ship specifically for the Ascension Island liner service. The first American crew embarked November 25, 1998 and the ship started its maiden voyage under the U.S.-flag on December 2, 1998. The voyage ended when the ship dropped anchor in Clarence Bay, Ascension on December 17, 1998. The original contract was for a period of three years.

On December 7, 1999 the Ascension rendered assistance to the French sailboat Seneca.  The sailboat was en route to Guadeloupe from France had been becalmed for three days.  In addition to providing 300 liters of fuel, the Ascension topped off the sailboat's water tank and provided cigarettes and soft drinks.

Ship's complement
The ship's complement is the captain and members of the deck, engine, and steward's departments.  As of 1998, the deck department consisted of the chief mate, the second mate, four able seamen, and two ordinary seamen  The engine department consisted of the chief engineer, a first assistant engineer, a second assistant engineer, and 3 oilers.  The steward's department consisted solely of one chief steward.

Route and cargo
The ship travels a dedicated liner route between Cape Canaveral, Florida and Ascension Island so as to arrive at the island at 60-day intervals. The Island is named after the day of its recorded discovery, Ascension Day.

The cargo consists mainly of intermodal containers, refrigerated shipping containers, as well as break bulk cargo.  The ship also carries cargo for non-US, civilian customers  The unloading process can consist of over 100 separate lifts and take several days

Ascension is the most notable nesting ground for Chelonia mydas in the Southern Atlantic Ocean. On Ascension, annual nesting occurs in the volume of around 6,000 to 13,000 individual turtle nests.

See also

Sealift Incorporated
List of Military Sealift Command ships
Container ship
Bulk carrier

Notes

References

External links
 Sealift Incorporated
Marine Turtle Research Group Homepage for Ascension Island Turtle Project
Sedef Shipyard

Merchant ships of the United States
Container ships
1992 ships
Cargo liners
Ascension Island